Unmarried Mothers (Spanish: Madres solteras) is a 1975 Spanish film directed by Antonio del Amo.

Cast
 Rafael Alonso  
 José Bódalo  
 Florinda Chico  
 Inma de Santis as Montse 
 Paca Gabaldón  
 Juan Luis Galiardo 
 Charo López  
 Isabel María Pérez  
 Manuel Zarzo

References

Bibliography 
 de España, Rafael. Directory of Spanish and Portuguese film-makers and films. Greenwood Press, 1994.

External links 
 

1975 films
Spanish drama films
1970s Spanish-language films
Films directed by Antonio del Amo
1970s Spanish films
1975 drama films